The Puritalia Berlinetta is a hybrid grand tourer manufactured by Italian automobile manufacturer Puritalia Automobili. Introduced at the 2019 Geneva Motor Show, it is the first car produced by the company. The car is intended to be a representation of the classic grand touring cars produced in the 1960s.

Overview 
The Berlinetta is an evolution of the 427 Roadster, a modern interpretation of the AC Cobra, introduced in concept form in 2012.

Powertrain 
Internal Combustion Engine (ICE)The ICE is an American supplied unit, namely a 5.0-litre double overhead camshaft V8 engine from Ford Motor Company. The engine is accompanied by a 2.9-litre twin-screw type supercharger. The block of the engine is cast from aluminium by an American supplier and is shipped to Italy for completion and installation. The buyers have the option to engrave their name on the block of the engine. The engine has a longitudinal front mid-mounted position in order to achieve a 50/50 weight distribution.

Electric motorThe axial-flow electric motor is supplied by Britain based YASA Limited and weighs .

Transmission 
The engine is mated to a 7-speed automated manual transmission in order to handle the combined power output of the powertrain. The gearshifting is managed by two paddles mounted on the steering column.

Battery 
The car comes equipped with two 5.2 kWh Lithium Iron Phosphate batteries housed under the trunk and behind the seats.

Chassis and exterior 

The chassis of the Berlinetta consists of a carbon fibre monocoque mated to an aluminium subframe at the front and rear. The body is entirely made of carbon fibre and takes 800 man hours to complete.

Suspension, brakes and tyres 
The Berlinetta is equipped with 19-inch forged alloy wheels wrapped in tyres measuring 285/30 at the front and 335/20 at the rear. The brakes are from AP Racing and have steel discs measuring  front and aft having six-piston calipers at the front and four piston calipers at the rear. Carbon ceramic brakes are available as an option. The suspension system is milled from aluminium using a CNC machine.

Interior 

The interior of the car has leather upholstery and a centrally mounted 12.3-inch touchscreen instead of conventional buttons and levers. The touch screen controls most of the car's functions and a dedicated display behind the steering wheel displays vital data to the driver. The hybrid system of the car called Purhydrive is controlled by artificial intelligence via a specialised software. The car displays real time data about weather, road conditions and the traffic to the driver. The effective use of energy by the powertrain is determined by the server connected to the car via cloud networking.

The car has three driving modes namely Corsa, Sport and e Power with the latter running the car on the electric motor only. A special switch called the eMozione controls the torque produced by the electric motor and raises the torque of the motor to the maximum for 45 seconds.

Performance 

Production 
Production of the Berlinetta will be limited to 150 units and each car will be hand-built according to the customer's desire. The cars will be sold to selected "brand ambassadors" who appreciate the car as stated by the company.

References

External links 

 

Cars of Italy
Coupés
Hybrid electric cars
Plug-in hybrid vehicles
Grand tourers
All-wheel-drive vehicles
Cars introduced in 2019